Lambert Hancart  was abbot of Gembloux from 1557 until his death on 28 August 1578.

As a member of the States of Brabant, he was delegated to present the communications of the States General to Philip II of Spain.

After the Battle of Gembloux (1578) he prevented the plundering of the town of Gembloux.

References

Abbots of Gembloux
1578 deaths
People of the Eighty Years' War
Members of the States of Brabant